HMS Slinger has been the name of several Royal Navy vessels:

 , an aircraft catapult vessel purchased 1917 and sold 1919
 , built as USS Chatham, on Lend-Lease from 1942 to 1946
 , launched 1944 was named Slinger from 1947 to 1956

References
 

Royal Navy ship names